Shingo (written: , , , , , , ,  or ) is a masculine Japanese given name. Notable people with the name include:

, Japanese speed skater
, Imperial Japanese Navy officer
, Japanese shogi player
, Japanese marathon runner
, Japanese footballer
, Japanese shogi player
, Japanese water polo player
, Japanese golfer
, member of SMAP, a Japanese male idol group
, Japanese sprinter
, Japanese baseball player
, Japanese sport wrestler
, Japanese singer, actor and idol
, Japanese director
, Japanese shogi player
, Japanese footballer
, Japanese baseball player
, Japanese professional wrestler

Fictional characters
Shingo, a character in the anime series Uninhabited Planet Survive!
Shingo, a character in the Skate video game series
Shingo Aoi, a character in the Captain Tsubasa series
Shingo Mido, a character in the manga series Death Note
Shingo Tsukino, a character appearing in manga series Sailor Moon
Shingo Yabuki, a character in the King of Fighters series
Shingo Shoji, a character in the Initial D series
Shingo Wakamoto, a main character of Prison School

Japanese masculine given names